Sarah Cook is the name of: 

 Sarah Cook (curator), Canadian curator and art historian
 Sarah Cook (rower), Australian rower
 Sarah Cook (squash player), squash player from New Zealand